Lillian Walker Walker, known as Lillian W. Walker (May 8, 1923 – December 22, 2016), was a member of the Louisiana House of Representatives from East Baton Rouge Parish, Louisiana, who served two terms from 1964 to 1972.

Biography
After two terms in the state House, Walker was narrowly unseated in the general election held on February 1, 1972, by the Republican Clark Gaudin, also of Baton Rouge.

On November 2, 1982, more than a decade after her state House service ended, Walker was elected to the Louisiana Board of Elementary and Secondary Education.

A native of Meridian in Lauderdale County in eastern Mississippi, Walker had the maiden name of "Walker" too. Her parents were Rudolph Blanche Walker and the former Maggie Elizabeth George.

Until his death, Walker was married for fifty-six years to Edward E. Walker (1921–1998).

Walker was a charter member in 1956 of the Broadmoor Presbyterian Church at 9340 Florida Boulevard in Baton Rouge; she was the captain of its first building fund in 1957. She died at her home in Baton Rouge at the age of ninety-three. She is entombed at Greenoaks Mausoleum in Baton Rouge.

References

1923 births
2016 deaths
Democratic Party members of the Louisiana House of Representatives
Politicians from Baton Rouge, Louisiana
Politicians from Meridian, Mississippi
Women state legislators in Louisiana
American political activists
Insurance agents
American Presbyterians
Burials in Louisiana
21st-century American women
20th-century American politicians
20th-century American women politicians